Nepetin is the 6-Methoxy derivative of the pentahydroxyflavone 6-Hydroxyluteolin, an O-methylated flavone. It can be found in Eupatorium ballotaefolium.

Glycosides 
Nepitrin is the 7-glucoside of nepetin.

References 

O-methylated flavones
Catechols
Resorcinols